Mihai Timofti - Master of Arts (born September 19, 1948) is a director, actor, musician and professor from Chisinau, Moldova.

In 1965 he started his activity in the popular theatre "Contemporanul" (Art Director was the playwright Mr G.Timofte), where he appeared for the first time on the stage performing the leading part in the comedy of Mr G. Timofte "The Dreams and Troubles".

In 1967, he graduated from the E.Coca Musical School (now it is the Ch. Porumbescu Lyceum), the clarinet class & piano.

At the Moscow Festival of the Popular Theatres in 1967 Mihai Timofti was awarded two gold medals for the leading part in the comedy "The Dreams and Troubles" and for the music written to this play.

In 1971, he graduated from the G. Musicescu State Conservatoire (the faculty of Director of Drama).

From 1971 to 1981, he worked at the Moldova Film Studio. He turned out about 40 documentary and short musical films.

In 1985, he took an external degree of the N. Rimsky – Korsakov Leningrad (St. Petersburg) State Conservatoire, the faculty of Director of Opera.

Since 1993 Mihai Timofti is a citizen of Romania.

In 2007, M. Timofti was awarded the honorary title of "Master of Arts".

On March 25, 2019 - He was awarded the "Eugene Ureche" Award at the UNITEM 2019 Prize Gala, 18th Edition

Repertory

Director (Performances)
(From 1971 to 1981: Mihai Timofti turned out about 40 documentary and short musical films.)
The Drama performance "Macbeth" by W. Shakespeare
The Musical "Birthday of Leopold the Cat" by B. Saveliev (First staged in the Soviet Union)
The Musical "The Treasure of Captain Flint" by B. Saveliev
The Opera "Manon Lescaut" by G. Puccini
The Comic Opera "Dorothea" by T. Hrennikov
The Operetta "The king of Waltz" by J. Strauss
The Musical "Donna Lucia" by O. Feltsman
The Operetta "Silva" by I.Kalman
The Operetta "The Count of Luxembourg" by Lehar
The Musical "An Ugly Duckling" children’s opera by I.Kovach
The Operetta "The Story of the Lead Soldier" by D. Capoianu
The Operetta "Mademoiselle Nitouche" by F. Hervé
The Musical "Fantasy of Christmas" by Mihai Timofti
The Operetta Evening – "The Ball – Surprise" by Mihai Timofti
The children’s opera “Peter Pan” by L. Profetta
The Opera "Lucia di Lammermoor" by Donizetti
The Operetta "Rose – Mary" by Friml and Stothart
The Opera "Otello" by G. Verdi
The Opera "Carmen" by G. Bizet
The Opera "Aida" by G. Verdi
The Operetta "Die Fledermaus" by J. Strauss (English Version)
Theatrical Concert “Dor de Eminescu”
The Operetta "The Merry Widow" by F. Lehár
The Operetta "Die Fledermaus" by J. Strauss (Romanian Version)
The Opera "The Troubadour" by G. Verdi

Actor
The Musical "The Dreams and Troubles" by M. Timofti — Take
The Drama performance "Serghei Lazo" by G. Timofte — holder of order
The Drama performance "Victim" by G. Timofte — romanian officer
The Drama performance "A Noisy Love" by G. Timofte — Nicolae
The Film "Lăutarii" by E. Loteanu — Vasile
The Vaudeville "The Hussar`s Matchmaking" — Hussar
The Drama performance "The Death of Theodore Ioanovich" — Boyar Kleshnin
The Drama performance "The Dead Souls" by N. Gogol — Nozdryov
The Drama performance "Macbeth" by W. Shakespeare — Macbeth
The Musical "Birthday of Leopold the Cat" by B. Saveliev — Cat Leopold
The Operetta "Die Fledermaus" by J. Strauss (English Version) — Frosch
The Operetta "The Merry Widow" by F. Lehár — Njegus
The Operetta "Die Fledermaus" by J. Strauss (Romanian Version) — Frosch

Scenarist
The Musical "Fantasy of Christmas"
The Operetta Evening – "The Ball – Surprise"
Theatrical Concert “Dor de Eminescu”

Composer
The Musical "The Dreams and Troubles"

Selected performances

Orenburg Theatre of Musical Comedy (Director 1984-1985)
"Birthday of Leopold the Cat" by B. Saveliev
"Rose – Mary" by Friml and Stothart.

Saransk Musical Theatre (Head Director 1986-1988)
"The king of Waltz" by J. Strauss
The Comic Opera "Dorothea" by T. Hrennikov
"Donna Lucia" by O. Feltsman

Tomsk Musical Theatre (Director 1989-1990)
"The Treasure of Captain Flint" by B. Saveliev
"Dorothea" by T. Hrennikov

National Theatre of Opera and Ballet "Maria Bieşu" (Director and Actor 1990-present)
1990 – „An Ugly Duckling” children’s opera by I. Kovach
1991 – The Operetta Evening – “ The Ball – Surprise ” (the scenario written by Mihai Timofti)
The Operetta "The Story of the Lead Soldier" by D. Capoianu (National Opera and Ballet "Oleg Danovski", Constanta, Romania)
1992 – The Operetta “Mademoiselle Nitouche” by F. Hervé (The Musical Theatre, Galats, Romania)
1993 – The Opera “Lucia di Lammermoor” by Donizetti, The children’s opera “Peter Pan”
1996 – The Musical “ Fantasy of Christmas ” (the scenario written by Mihai Timofti)
1997 – The Opera “Carmen” by G. Bizet
2005 – The Opera “Aida” by G. Verdi
2006 – The Operetta “Die Fledermaus” by J. Strauss (English Version) (Director and the role of Frosch: Mihai Timofti)
2012 – Theatrical Concert “Dor de Eminescu” (the scenario written by Mihai Timofti)
 The Operetta “The Merry Widow” by F. Lehár (Director and the role of Njegus: Mihai Timofti)
2013 – The Operetta “Die Fledermaus” by J. Strauss (Romanian Version) (Director and the role of Frosch: Mihai Timofti)
 Opera "Il trovatore" by G. Verdi 
2014 – „An Ugly Duckling” children’s opera by I. Kovach

Tours
Russia, Spain, Ireland, Great Britain, Romania, Portugal, Germany, Switzerland ...

References

External links 
 Official Site 
 
 
  Interviu cu Maestrul Mihai Timofti by Gabriel Teodor Gherasim, New York City

1948 births
Living people
Moldovan theatre directors
Musical theatre directors
Moldovan film directors
Moldovan male stage actors
Moldovan musicians
Saint Petersburg Conservatory alumni